Dato' Haji Abdul Halim bin Hussain is a Malaysian politician and currently serves as Penang State Executive Councillor.

Election results

Honours
  :
  Companion of the Order of the Defender of State (DMPN) – Dato’ (2009)

References 

Living people
People from Penang
Malaysian people of Malay descent
 People's Justice Party (Malaysia) politicians
21st-century Malaysian politicians
Year of birth missing (living people)
Members of the Penang State Legislative Assembly
 Penang state executive councillors
Speakers of the Penang State Legislative Assembly